Kondwa Sakala-Chibiya is a Zambian lawyer and Vice Chair for the Human Rights Commission, and former President of SADC Lawyers Association. She is a board member of the Centre for Infectious Disease Research in Zambia, and currently serves as a member of the Judicial Service Commission, following her appointment by Hakainde Hichilema.

References

Living people
Year of birth missing (living people)